Shruti Seth is an Indian actress and video jockey. Having begun her career as television show host, she gained wider recognition with her roles as comedian in several television shows and the Hindi film industry.

Born and brought up in Mumbai, Maharashtra, Seth graduated St. Xavier's College with a degree in economics. She ventured into a modelling career and began hosting television shows for Channel V. A significant turning point came in her career when she cast in the role of Jiya Malhotra, a teenage in Star Plus's comedy series Shararat (2003–06). The show's popularity grew over the years and Seth gained prominence for her performance.

Seth made her film debut in 2003 with Waisa Bhi Hota Hai Part II, and later earned praise for her supporting roles in top-grossing productionsFanaa (2006) and Slumdog Millionaire (2008). Seth starred in Disney Channel's original series The Suite Life of Karan & Kabir and continued to host such television shows as the Comedy Circus series.

Personal life
Seth attended Ashok Academy and graduated from St. Xavier's College, Mumbai with a degree in Economics and Commerce. She is married to film director Danish Aslam, and together they have a daughter named Alina.
Seth is of Punjabi Hindu origin.

A controversy arose when Aslam commented on Twitter in critique of Indian Prime Minister Narendra Modi's #selfiewithdaughter campaign for women and girls, which he announced in his Mann Ki Baat radio address. After this she started to receive abuse through Twitter and social media. This resulted in members of the media and Bollywood defending her against the abuse.

Career

Television roles
Seth started her career as a guest relation executive at the Taj Mahal Hotel, Bombay. She began modelling at the same time "to make some pocket money", and was soon offered guest roles in a few television shows.  Seth then hosted such successful shows as First Day First Show and Junglee Jukebox on Channel V. She said, in a later interview, that it was her time as a video jockey and television presenter on the channel "that firmly put me on the map."

 
Seth auditioned for a role in the Star Plus sitcom Shararat. Co-starring Farida Jalal and Eva Grover, the show followed the life of teenager who, on her eighteenth birthday, discovers she has magical powers. Seth was cast in the lead role; her performance received positive response from critics and fans. The show was in itself a surprise success and ran for three years on the network.

Seth went on to star in other television show including Kyun Hota Hai Pyarrr, Des Mein Niklla Hoga Chand, and Rishta.com on Sony Entertainment Television. On Rishta.com, she said in an interview that, "They (the Yash Raj serials) haven't got any TRPs at all. But it's not for the people who are watching TV in the first place. The whole TRP game is very skewed. I don't believe that in a population of over a billion people, 15,000 households decide what the entire country wants to watch. This lot of Yash Raj was conceptualised for those who are not watching TV". She further said in the same interview that "All our loyal audience for my serial on TV is in London, America, South Africa, Australia. It's not that the Indians will not like it, it's just sad that they are not aware of it, because the publicity has been disappointing". She has also hosted several seasons of Comedy Circus on Sony Channel.

Film career
Seth has starred in a few films. On moving from television to films, she stated that, "I haven't really moved on to anything. It's not that I would not do TV and only do films. Yes, more avenues have started opening for me. I am game for doing something exciting on any medium – stage, celluloid or TV". She is probably best known for her role as Fatima "Fatty" in Fanaa (2006) with Aamir Khan and Kajol. She starred in Tara Rum Pum, produced by Yash Raj Films and made an appearance in Prakash Jha's film Raajneeti in 2010. On her role in Rajneeti, she said in an interview that "I am hoping that my hard-hitting role in Rajneeti will change my being typecast, because it is the most unlikely character one would expect me to play".

Filmography

Films

Television

Web series

References

External links

 
 

Living people
Actresses from Mumbai
Indian television actresses
Indian film actresses
Female models from Mumbai
People from Mumbai
Punjabi people
Punjabi Hindus
St. Xavier's College, Mumbai alumni
Actresses in Hindi cinema
Indian soap opera actresses
Actresses in Gujarati cinema
21st-century Indian actresses
Actresses in Hindi television
1977 births
Indian VJs (media personalities)